The Kountze Place neighborhood of Omaha, Nebraska is a historically significant community on the city's north end.  Today the neighborhood is home to several buildings and homes listed on the National Register of Historic Places. It is located between North 16th Avenue on the east to North 30th Street on the west; Locust Street on the south to Pratt Street on the north. Kountze Place was annexed into Omaha in 1887. The neighborhood was built as a suburban middle and upper middle class enclave for doctors, lawyers, successful businessmen and other professional workers.

About
Bordered by the historic neighborhoods of the Near North Side, Saratoga and East Omaha, Kountze Place was an early upper middle class residential suburb developed by Omaha banker Herman Kountze in 1883. It was originally accessible only via streetcar.

In 1898 Kountze Place was home to the Trans-Mississippi Exposition, a showcase for Nebraska's agricultural and Omaha's urban lifestyles. In 1899 some of the land that the Expo occupied was developed into Kountze Park. The area around the park was filled in with housing afterwards, with some Exposition buildings being converted into grand houses.

A March 1907 Omaha Sunday Bee advertisement promotes Kountze Place:

Some of Kountze Place was affected by the Easter Sunday Tornado of 1913, with landmarks such as Trinity Methodist Church to be rebuilt in other parts of the city. Additionally around this time, many of Kountze Place's richer residents were lured to areas such as Bemis Park and Gold Coast with promises of higher land values.

Landmarks
Several buildings and homes in Kountze Place are listed on the National Register of Historic Places and designated as Omaha Landmarks by the City of Omaha. Former landmarks in the area included the Presbyterian Theological Seminary, built in 1902 at 3303 North 21st Place. It was closed in 1943.

Omaha University
Omaha University, now called the University of Nebraska at Omaha, was once located on one city block at 24th and Pratt Streets on the Redick estate. Their proposed "magnificent campus" was slated to be placed between  21st and 25th Avenues, bounded by Kountze Park and the Carter Lake Park. Original faculty came from the aforementioned Seminary, as well as Bellevue College. The first class meetings occurred at the Redick Mansion at 24th and Pratt.

In 1927 businessmen formed the North Omaha Activities Association in order to redevelop Saratoga School's playing field into a football field for Omaha University's football team. At that time the university was located just south in the posh Kountze Place suburb. With new bleachers built to accommodate a crowd of a thousand, the Saratoga Field was home to OU's team until 1951.

UNO moved to its present location in 1929.

See also
History of North Omaha

External links
 "A History of Omaha's Kountze Place Neighborhood," by Adam Fletcher Sasse for NorthOmahaHistory.com.

References

Neighborhoods in Omaha, Nebraska
History of North Omaha, Nebraska
Historic districts in Omaha, Nebraska
University of Nebraska Omaha
Kountze family
World's fair sites in the United States
Trans-Mississippi Exposition